The United States Air Force's 8th Intelligence Squadron is an intelligence unit located at Hickam AFB, Hawaii.

Lineage
 Constituted as the 8th Photo Lab Section on 21 Oct 1943
 Activated on 1 Nov 1943
 Redesignated 8th Photographic Technical Unit on 4 Nov 1944
 Inactivated on 1 Apr 1949
 Redesignated 8th Reconnaissance Technical Squadron on 16 October 1984 (remained inactive)
 Redesignated 8th Intelligence Squadron on 9 Dec 2008
 Activated on 1 January 2009

Assignments
 III Reconnaissance Command, 1 November 1943
 Fifth Air Force, 30 April 1944
 91st Photographic Wing (later 91st Reconnaissance Wing), 8 May 1944
 V Bomber Command, 6 March 1946
 Fifth Air Force, 14 November 1948
 314th Air Division, 20 August 1948 – 1 April 1949
 692d Intelligence, Surveillance and Reconnaissance Group, 1 Jan 2009 – present

Stations

 Will Rogers Field, Oklahoma, 1 November 1943
 Woodward Army Air Field, Oklahoma, 27 December 1943
 Will Rogers Field, Oklahoma, 6 Feb 1944
 Camp Stoneman, California, 26 March – 9 April 1944
 Australia, 30 April 1944
 Nadzab, New Guinea, 5 May 1944
 Hollandia, New Guinea, 25 June 1944
 Biak Island New Guinea, 14 August 1944
 Leyte, Philippines, 5 November 1944
 Mindoro, Philippines, 29 January 1945
 Clark Field, Luzon, Philippines, 20 March 1945
 Toguchi, Okinawa, 27 July 1945
 Tachikawa, Japan, 27 September 1945
 Irumagawa Army Air Base, Japan, 19 January 1946 – 1 April 1949
 Hickam Air Force Base, Hawaii, 1 Jan 2009 – present

Decorations
 Air Force Outstanding Unit Award
 Philippine Republic Presidential Unit Citation

References
 Notes

 Notes

Bibliography

 

Military units and formations in Hawaii
0008